The 1946 Hawaii Rainbows football team was an American football team that represented the University of Hawaii as an independent during the 1946 college football season.  In its second non-consecutive season under Tom Kaulukukui, the team compiled an 8–2 record and outscored opponents by a total of 275 to 93.

Schedule

References

Hawaii
Hawaii Rainbow Warriors football seasons
Hawaii Rainbows football